Robert Martin (born 16 May 1929), generally known as Roy Martin, is a Scottish former professional footballer who played as a full back. He made 150 appearances in the English Football League playing for Birmingham City and Derby County.

Born in Glengarnock, Ayrshire, Martin began his football career with local club Kilwinning Rangers. He came to England and signed professional forms for First Division Birmingham City in March 1950. By the time he made his first-team debut some nine months later, standing in for the injured Ken Green, the club had been relegated to the Second Division. In six years with the club he made 74 appearances in all competitions but was never first choice at full back, playing only as cover for Green, Jack Badham, and later, the England international Jeff Hall. In March 1956 he joined Derby County, and the following season helped them to win the championship of the Third Division (North).

References
 
 

1929 births
Living people
Footballers from North Ayrshire
Scottish footballers
Association football fullbacks
Kilwinning Rangers F.C. players
Birmingham City F.C. players
Derby County F.C. players
Burton Albion F.C. players
Long Eaton United F.C. players
English Football League players
People from Dalry, North Ayrshire
Scottish Junior Football Association players